SS Stevens, a , 14,893-ton ship, served as a floating dormitory from 1968 to 1975 for about 150 students of Stevens Institute of Technology, a technological university, in Hoboken, NJ. Permanently moored on the scenic Hudson River at the foot of the campus across from New York City, this first collegiate floating dormitory became one of the best known college landmarks in the country.

Originally launched in 1944, Dauphin was awarded one battle star and was present in Tokyo Bay for the Surrender Ceremony of World War II, September 2, 1945.

Following the war, the vessel underwent significant modifications, and emerged as cruise liner  — a member of the post-war quartet of ships named "4 Aces", operated by American Export Lines. During her eleven years of cruise liner service, from 1948 to 1959, Exochorda — along with her nearly identical sister ships in the "4 Aces" — regularly sailed with passengers and cargo on a  route from New York Harbor to various Mediterranean ports. Exochorda was retired to the US Navy reserve ("mothball") fleet in 1959 where she remained for eight years.

Exochorda's conversion to a dormitory ship, following her purchase by Stevens Institute of Technology in 1967, required only minor modifications such as the connection of land-based water, sewer and electric utilities.  Accommodations enjoyed by many student residents aboard Stevens included private baths and in-room control of heating and air-conditioning.  Featuring portholes, roll-up berths and nautically-themed artwork, Stevens became quite popular among her residents.

Purchased by the institute to fill a shortfall in student housing, the ship's operating costs during the initial years of service were comparable to conventional land-based dormitory housing.  In later years, however, the ship's burgeoning operating and repair costs, combined with a more favorable housing outlook, forced the institute to sell Stevens in 1975.  In tribute, one of her 6-ton anchors was prominently placed on the campus grounds by the graduating Class of 1975. In August 1975, the ship was towed to a shipyard in Chester, Pennsylvania, and she was subsequently scrapped in 1979.

Location and design

Setting

From the west bank of the Hudson River, opposite mid-town Manhattan, Stevens offered her residents a panoramic view of the New York skyline extending from the George Washington Bridge in the north, to the Verrazano-Narrows Bridge in the south.  Located at the foot of the Stevens Institute of Technology campus in Hoboken, her venue afforded viewing of the large variety of watercraft that frequented the river. Silently gliding past portholes, river vessels imparted the sensation of motion to residents aboard their stationary home.

Notable among the ships witnessed by Stevens residents was the great transatlantic ocean liner, sailing from New York on her final voyage, October 30, 1968.  For Stevens' residents, all vessels traveling the river were bestowed New York City's picturesque backdrop.

Moored in place
Stevens was moored at the foot of a bluff, above which much of the campus is situated.  With her starboard side adjacent to the Eighth Street pier at River Road, she was secured at her bow and stern by a total of seven mooring lines. With concurrence by the Coast Guard, four sets of pilings were driven into the river bed, wedging the ship in place and preventing her from drifting downriver in the event the lines were cut.  Although she carried four anchors, two on chains at her bow, and two more fastened in place on deck, none were used to anchor the ship.

The robustness of her mooring system was often demonstrated during major storms that swept through the New York area.  Despite high winds and accompanying storm surge, the pilings and mooring lines held the ship in place, usually without incident, except for minor damage in some rooms caused by toppling of unsecured personal items.

In a separate incident unrelated to storm activity, a departing cruise ship — while maneuvering to avoid a collision with two other departing cruise ships — passed unusually close to Stevens.  The resulting wake from the passing ship tossed Stevens and caused the mooring bollard securing the bow lines to break away from its footing on the pier.  The pilings and remaining lines held the ship in place without further incident.

Access to pier and campus

Access to Stevens from the campus-owned Eighth Street Pier was facilitated by two gangplanks.  A double-ramped covered gangplank provided access from the main "A" deck foyer to a fixed, elevated platform on the pier.  Two stairways connected the elevated platform to the pier surface.  A second gangplank, an uncovered single ramp, provided access to the lower "B" deck directly from the pier surface.  Rollers attached to the end of each gangplank accommodated the ship's motion on the water.

An alternative route was improvised by students seeking to substantially reduce walking time and distance. This route, dubbed "Ho Chi Minh trail", or simply, "the trail", required scaling the treacherous  bluff directly below the Student Center building on the upper campus and was frequented by the ship's more intrepid residents.

Cabin plan, decks and cargo

Stevens comprised a lower "B" deck, main "A" deck, Promenade, Boat and Sun decks. Students' quarters and public spaces were distributed throughout all decks except for Sun deck which was closed.

The main "A" deck, the highest deck to extend the entire length of the ship, included a center section with students' rooms and the ship's main foyer with gangway.

The lower "B" deck contained the largest number of students' rooms, recreational areas and the ship's laundry room, equipped with automatic washers and dryers.

Promenade deck, immediately above the main deck, contained students' rooms and the ship's more frequently used lounges.  The aft lounge, the largest on the ship featured expansive casement windows, oak furniture and rift-cut American oak paneling.  French doors provided access to the promenade for open-air strolling and sightseeing. Promenade's forward lounge, paneled in Kelobra wood, was often used for smaller social gatherings.

Boat deck carried the ship's six lifeboats, three on each side, including one motorized boat, the center boat on the port side.  The ship was fitted with gravity roller track davits for the larger aft and center boats.  The curved davit arms extended over the open portion of Promenade deck.  Radial single pivot davits were implemented for the smaller forward boats.

Sun deck contained the ship's wheelhouse flanked by docking bridges.  Outside viewing by wheel house personnel was facilitated by three large forward-looking portholes, flanked by smaller portholes.

Areas below "B" deck, not authorized for passenger access and closed for students, comprised "C" deck, engine room, shaft alley, fuel tanks and water ballast areas.

The cabin plan shows the following number of students' rooms on the ship:

The ship contained six cargo holds numbered 1 through 6, starting at the bow. Hatch location for cargo holds are:

Heritage of Stevens

Adventuresome past

Contrary to her sedentary life as a floating dormitory, the ship's past was filled with travels to numerous ports in Europe and the Far East including Okinawa, Tokyo and Pearl Harbor in the Pacific.  As Windsor-class attack transport Dauphin for the US Navy, from 1944 to 1948, she was awarded one battle star in the assault on and occupation of Okinawa and earned the Navy Occupation Service Medal for landing cargo and troops in Japan.  She was present in Tokyo Bay for the Surrender Ceremony of World War II, September 2, 1945.

Following the war, and after significant refurbishment, the vessel became cruise liner Exochorda, a member of the quartet of ships known collectively as "4 Aces" — the replacement for the pre-war quartet of ships with the same names — operated by American Export Lines. Among her passengers were potentates of the East, routinely accompanied by cooks and bodyguards. An Arab ruler once brought his entire entourage on board, complete with swords and machine guns. Notable among her passengers was actress Rita Hayworth, a popular film star and dancer. In 1956, Exochorda was called upon to assist in the rapid evacuation of 350 Americans from Alexandria, Egypt during a military conflict that became known as the Suez Crisis.

At the end of her active service in 1959, Exochorda was placed in reserve until plans to sell her were announced in June 1967.

Need for student housing
As early as 1965, the idea for buying a ship arose as an interim solution to the potential housing gap following the institute's forecast of an increase in student enrollment. With the student body having grown to 1350 students, an increase of about 150 students over the prior year, a strain was created on the institute's existing land-based dormitory housing. Owning suitable waterfront property on the Hudson River, the institute assessed the feasibility of purchasing a ship for temporary use as a dormitory until additional land-based dormitories became available. The institute expected to recoup its original investment in the ship through its continued operation and eventual sale for scrap.

Purchase of Exochorda
In June 1967, the U.S. Maritime Administration announced plans to sell the former cruise liner, Exochorda, for either non-transportation use or scrap.  Assisted by shipbuilding experts, the institute prepared and submitted a bid for the ship.  The bid was announced September 28, 1967.  Within one week of the institute's bid, the U.S. Maritime Administration awarded Exochorda to Stevens Institute of Technology for $130,301 — the highest bid and $6,700 more than offered by a scrap metal dealer. The cost of purchasing and refurbishing the ship brought its total cost to approximately $500,000. The total expenditure was not considered excessive when compared to an estimated several million dollars the institute would have had to spend on conventional dormitory housing.  "We didn't think a permanent building was a wise investment", said Wilson T. Crisman, the institute's director of auxiliary operations.  The institute planned to continue the vessel's operation as a dormitory for several years but intended taking her offline if the student population were to decrease.

Refurbishment as floating dormitory

On October 4, 1967, within a week of being purchased by the institute, Exochorda was towed by tugboats from the Hudson River Reserve Fleet in Jones Point, NY to the Hoboken Yard of Bethlehem Steel Corporation in Hoboken, New Jersey, where refurbishing work prepared the ship to become a floating dormitory. The ship's engines were deactivated and the engine room and cargo hatches were sealed. External utility service ports were installed to permit connecting the ship's electrical, heating, water and sewage systems to land-based utility services. Deck equipment, including the many kingposts and booms used to load and unload the cargo holds, were removed, except for two masts. The hull was painted pristine white.  Final preparation for students included adding rugs, mattresses and draperies.  Additionally, the air-conditioning system was overhauled.

Wilson T. Crisman, the institute's director of auxiliary operations and boating enthusiast long before the school acquired the vessel, oversaw the ship's purchase and conversion. According to Crisman, the ship was 99 percent in condition for use by the institute, which kept refurbishment costs down.

Comparison with Exochorda's cabin plan
Formerly occupied by passengers aboard Exochorda, the staterooms located on Promenade deck, "A" deck, and the section of "B" deck forward of the lounge, remained unchanged except for the limited removal of furniture as required to accommodate desks for students.  Most staterooms had been designed for three passengers and included upper and lower berths plus a convertible sofa berth.  For these rooms, the sofa berth was removed to accommodate a desk.  Other changes included replacement of carpeting, draperies and mattresses.  Where possible, rooms not occupied by the traveling public, such as the crew and officers' quarters, were made available as rooms for students. Other rooms on Exochorda not suitable for use as either living quarters or public spaces were permanently closed.

Exochorda's dining hall — on "B" deck, paneled with light, figured walnut and displaying artwork by artist Loren MacIver — became the main lounge on Stevens. The room remained unchanged except for the removal of the artwork and free-standing tables and chairs.   Once the location of a table-for-eight on the port side became the site for  Stevens' ping-pong table .  Despite sloping floors, at times accentuated by weather-induced listing of the ship, the ping-pong table was usually active.

Exochorda contained two suites, both on Promenade deck, that became room numbers 301 and 307 on Stevens.

A popular group of rooms, prominently featured in print ads for Exochorda and known as the  Veranda rooms, were groups of four rooms adjoining a common public area that contained four large exterior windows.  Two groups of Veranda rooms were on the ship, one on each side of "A" deck.  Veranda rooms, unchanged for Stevens, became room numbers: 214, 216, 218 and 220 on the port side, and 217, 219, 221 and 223 on the starboard.

Promenade's forward lounge, the former setting for captain's cocktail parties, and the aft lounge, known on Exochorda as the "bar and smoking lounge" which included Saul Steinberg's Life at Sea murals, remained unchanged except for the removal of free-standing tables and chairs.  The center section of carpeting in the forward lounge was also removed, exposing a dance floor.

Exochorda's outdoor swimming pool was located on a small open area of Promenade deck immediately aft of Promenade's smoking bar and lounge. For Stevens, the pool was deemed too small to be of practical use and was sealed.

Not occupied by passengers on Exochorda, crew quarters were used by students on Stevens.  Located aft of the main dining lounge on "B" deck, these rooms were smaller and some lacked amenities such as portholes which were included in the passenger staterooms.   The crew cabins, originally designed to sleep six crewmen, were converted into dormitory rooms for two students.  Former crew's quarters, also on the aft portion of "B" deck, were used to create recreational rooms.

Sun deck which included the wheelhouse, chart room (immediately behind wheelhouse), tiled kennel and dog run (port side) were all closed on Stevens.

Passenger cabin numbers on Exochorda used a letter prefix to signify the deck location.  Cabin number sequencing began on Promenade deck and increased to the next hundreds block for each succeeding lower deck, such as, "P1", "A122" and "B201" for cabins on Promenade, "A" and "B" decks, respectively.   Room numbers on Stevens omitted the letter prefix and were re-designated to begin in the 100s on the lowest ("B") deck and increased to the next hundreds block for each succeeding higher deck, such as "112", "201" and "314" for rooms on "B", "A" and Promenade decks, respectively.  Aside from the difference in level designator, plus a few exceptions for new rooms, correlation of room numbers on Stevens and Exochorda was maintained. For example, Exochorda's room "A122" became "222" on Stevens.Captain's and officers' quarters (Boat deck)"A" deck"B" deck'''

SS Stevens (1967–1975)

Maiden voyage and early life

On November 10, 1967, with ceremonies similar to those afforded ships on their maiden voyage, the former Exochorda and newly refurbished floating dormitory was moved by McAllister Brothers' tugboats from the shipyard to her new berth at the college-owned 8th Street Pier.  Two of the shipyard's workmen suffered a minor mishap when the gangplank slipped a few feet while being positioned on the pier.

The ship was rechristened Stevens by Mrs. Jess H. Davis, wife of the institute's president, Dr. Jess H. Davis.  The ship was originally named Castle Queen via a contest run by the student body in 1967. The name submitted by Joe Giacone, class of '69, was changed to SS Stevens, which was preferred by Mrs. Davis The Stute, Fall 1967.  Dr. Davis and William L. Bingham, dean of student affairs, formally took possession of the ship as the institute's flag was hoisted from the bridge.

Reflecting the technological nature of her namesake, Stevens Institute of Technology, the ship's single cigar-shaped funnel had been painted with an elongated red letter "S", the integral symbol — well known by her student residents through their study and application of the calculus.  The ship's name, "Stevens", had also been painted in black letters on her bow.

Connection of water, sewer and electric services with the Hoboken land utilities was facilitated by flexible piping (hoses) and cabling of sufficient length to accommodate the motion of the ship resulting from changing tides or severe weather.

Although she was a complete ship, containing an engine room, wheelhouse, bridge and decks, she was licensed by the State of New Jersey as a residence hall.  Designed to the highest Coast Guard standards (1948), fire safety doors and smoke ventilation systems were functional and met local regulations.

The first student residents of Stevens, a total of 150, moved aboard her in January 1968.

On Wednesday, May 22, 1968, an open house was held aboard Stevens in honor of National Maritime Day, commemorating the beginning of trans-Atlantic steam navigation.

When the first ocean-going training vessel for the Texas State Maritime Program, USTS Texas Clipper was in need of spare parts, Stevens, with the blessing of the U.S. Maritime Administration, answered her call.  As a benefit of their common heritage — Stevens, the former Exochorda, and Texas Clipper, the former Excambion, sisters ships in the post-war "4 Aces" — many parts were interchangeable between the two vessels.  The parts were made available to Texas Clipper during her visit to New York in June 1968, the first such visit since her conversion from Excambion.

Accommodations
In 1968, the per-student cost of a room for one semester ranged from $200 to $265, depending on available amenities such as portholes and private shower.  By 1975, the cost for a room with two students had risen to approximately $650 per student, per semester.

Rooms were equipped with desks and lamps, many of which were fixed in place, a common feature among seafaring vessels.  Heating and air-conditioning were controlled by a thermostat in each room, a significant feature also enjoyed by ocean-going passengers aboard Exochorda, one of the first fully air conditioned ships.

Most rooms were fitted with "ingeniously arranged oversize downy berths" — 79" by 34" roll-up beds operated by "an ingenious new device which by the simple turn of a wheel recesses the berths flush into the wall".   Prominent in Exochorda's advertising literature, the roll-up berths facilitated the conversion of rooms from sleeping quarters at night to spacious sitting rooms by day. The two large suites on the Promenade deck, featured twin beds.

The teak and dark blue leather chairs, depicted in many print ads and brochures for the "4 Aces", remained in the rooms.

While a typical room harbored the usual complement of personal items such as TV, stereo and refrigerator, students aboard the ship were afforded more latitude regarding individual décor as compared to their land-based counterparts.  Among the decorative touches found in rooms were oil paintings, hanging plants and a Persian print bedspread billowing from a sitting room ceiling.

For convenience, public telephones were available at multiple locations on the ship and were also available in rooms for an additional fee.

Art Deco trim and accents, evoking visions of a bygone era, graced her stairways and passageways.  On cabin doors, life jacket and lifeboat informational placards, having lost their vital significance to time and circumstance, remained dutifully posted.

Reminiscent of her former glory days on the high seas, a mural reflecting the ship's Mediterranean sailing route, by Miné Okubo, decorated the main foyer.  White-on-black depictions of life at sea — whimsical "doodles" by artist Saul Steinberg — added subtle context to Promenade's bar and smoking lounge.  Other artwork, however, such as Loren MacIver's mural portrayal of trade and commerce activities along the sailing route, originally in the ship's dining room ("B" deck lounge), had been removed prior to the ship's use as a dormitory.  Sculptress Mitzi Solomon's marble carvings, pictured in promenade's forward lounge in many "4 Aces" print advertisements, were also not seen by students.

Rules and regulations
Rules and regulations were loose except for prohibitions against excessive noise or vandalism, including breaking into refrigerators.  For safety reasons, those on board were warned: "Students will not be allowed to climb, hang or swing from any of the riggings, lifeboats or railings."  Resident dormitory representatives could often remedy such infractions with measures that included requiring the offending student to leave the ship.  Other rules stated that visitors were not permitted to be on the ship between 4 and 7 am.  Although women students were first admitted to the institute in 1971, they were prohibited from living on the ship until 1974. Commenting on the effect of women living aboard the ship, student resident Tom Poncho said, "Not much."  By 1975, nine women shared the ship with 91 men.

Popular with students
Despite the quiet and remote location of Stevens relative to the center of campus, rooms on the ship remained very much in demand.  Many of Stevens residents were delighted with their living arrangements and preferred the ship over conventional dormitory housing. Institute officials postulated that Stevens' popularity may have been due, in part, to the ship's appeal to "loners", a supposition consistent with students' statements. "It's quiet down here, more secluded and peaceful", said ship resident Kenneth Levy. Expressing a similar sentiment, resident Frank Condi said, "It's away from everything."  Other students, however, recognized the social advantages offered by their unique dwelling. Ship resident Martin Mercorelli remarked that the ship was "definitely a social asset. It seems to go over better with the girls." Other students indicated their preference for the ship by their unflattering characterization of other dormitory rooms as "cells".

In 1975, when announcing that the ship was to be sold, Kenneth C. Rogers, president of the institute, commented that the ship was "so popular with the students." Linda Soldati, one of the nine women students living on the ship said, "If I had $100,000 I'd buy her. I just don't want to go back to living in a house. The view is fantastic. I love the ship."

Escalating costs

During the initial five years of operation, maintenance and repair costs for Stevens were comparable to those of a land based dormitory. In early 1973, the institute had anticipated operating Stevens for another five years.

Within the next two years, however, declining enrollments, rising costs of heating the vessel and needed repairs prompted the institute to reassess the economics of maintaining Stevens.  In 1975, heating for the steel-hulled ship, which was delivered from land via steam pipe, cost the institute $40,000 per year.  As explained by institute president Kenneth C. Rogers, "Heating that ship is like trying to heat the whole Hudson River."  Adding to the financial burden, the need for extensive water system repair work became evident when the interior of a six-inch (152 mm)  section of the ship's water pipe was found to be nearly completely encrusted by rust.  After allowing for necessary painting and electrical wiring upgrades, the cost estimate for repairs totaled $100,000, forcing the institute's decision in April 1975 to sell the ship.

Farewell

In May 1975, shortly before Stevens was to be closed and sold, she "hosted" a large and memorable farewell party held in her honor.  A "For Sale" sign on her bow — for students, a melancholic reminder of her impending fate — had been posted by a prankster.  On the day following graduation, May 23, 1975, the last student to leave the country's only floating dormitory, William Walendzinski, a graduating senior and Stevens resident for the prior 3 years, descended her main gangplank for the final time.

On August 26, 1975, at 3:00 PM, the last of her mooring cables was burned away.  Without fanfare, tugboat Helen McAllister and two other Tony McAllister's '21 tugboats, part of the same fleet that brought Stevens to her berth in Hoboken in 1967, towed her to a Chester, Pennsylvania shipyard.

Students of the Class of 1975 presented funds to the institute for the preparation of a site on Wittpenn Walk, overlooking the ship's berthing area, where one of Stevens' six-ton anchors was placed in tribute to "the Ship", their "floating dormitory".

Recounting the events and sentiments on the day Stevens was towed away, the institute's alumni association expressed in its journal, "She disappeared into the fog and into our hearts."

After being partially dismantled in Chester, Pennsylvania, Stevens was resold to scrappers in Kearny, NJ, in March 1979.  Later, the remaining hulk was towed to the Raritan Bay port for final demolition, bringing an end to one of the most unusual careers of a ship.

Timeline of vessel
USS Dauphin (APA-97)
December 22, 1943 — Laid down (as cargo ship)
June 10, 1944 — Completed as Windsor-class military attack transport and launched by Bethlehem Sparrows Point Shipyard, Sparrows Point, Maryland
September 23, 1944 — Transferred to Navy and commissioned as Dauphin
September 2, 1945 — Present at the Surrender Ceremony of World War II in Tokyo Bay
April 30, 1946 — Dauphin decommissioned
1948 — Dauphin sold for commercial service
SS Exochorda
1948 — Refurbished as passenger-cargo ship, SS Exochorda, for American Export Lines
November 2, 1948 — Maiden voyage of Exochorda1948–1959 — Exochorda served as passenger-cargo ship sailing from New York to the Mediterranean
March 15, 1959 —  Exochorda towed to Bethlehem Steel Corp. for preparation to be placed in reserve fleet
1959–1967 — Returned to the US Maritime Administration and mothballed in Hudson River Reserve Fleet at Stony Point, NY
June 1967 — The U.S. Maritime Administration announced plans to sell the former cruise liner, Exochorda, for either non-transportation use or scrap
September 28, 1967 — Announcement of the institute's bid of $130,301 for ExochordaOctober 1967 — US Maritime Administration awards Exochorda to Stevens Institute of Technology for $130,301 to be used as a floating dormitory
October 4, 1967 — Exochorda was towed from the Hudson River Reserve Fleet in Jones Point, N.Y. to the Hoboken Yard of Bethlehem Steel Corporation in Hoboken, New Jersey to be refurbished as a dormitory
November 10, 1967 — Vessel towed from the Bethlehem Steel Corporation to the school-owned Eight Street Pier, Stevens Institute of Technology, Hoboken, NJ
SS StevensNovember 10, 1967 — Maiden voyage (unpowered)
November 1967 — Christened SS StevensJanuary 1968 — First student residents of Stevens moved aboard
May 22, 1968 — Stevens hosted an open house in honor of National Maritime Day
June 1968 — Stevens donated parts to her sister ship, USTS Texas Clipper, the former ExcambionSeptember 1974 — First women students permitted to reside on StevensApril 1975 — Rising heating and repair costs forced the institute to sell StevensMay 1975 — Farewell party held aboard StevensMay 23, 1975 — Last student leaves Stevens''
August 26, 1975 — Last Voyage: towed from Hoboken NJ to a shipyard in Chester, PA
1975–1979 — Partially dismantled in Chester, PA
March 1979 — Resold to scrappers at Kearny, NJ
1979 — Demolished at Raritan Bay port NJ

Notes

References

External links

Stevens Institute of Technology
Photo: USS Dauphin (APA-97); NavSource Online

Dormitory ships
Ships of American Export-Isbrandtsen Lines
Stevens Institute of Technology
Ships built in Sparrows Point, Maryland
1944 ships
1968 establishments in New Jersey
1975 disestablishments in New Jersey